Conservative Punk was a website that promoted conservative views in the punk subculture. It was created  by Nick Rizzuto, an employee of a New York City rock radio station, partially in response to the left-liberal group Punkvoter  (created by NOFX lead singer Fat Mike). The Conservative Punk website received significant press coverage during the 2004 presidential election. It includes contributions from talk radio personality Andrew Wilkow and former Misfits singer and Gotham Road frontman Michale Graves. Dorian Lynskey of The Guardian wrote about Rizzuto: "To his critics he's a crank bringing punk's good name into disrepute – but to his supporters he's the fearless voice of a formerly silent minority."

In early 2010, Nick Rizzuto, without notice, stopped paying the hosting fees for Conservativepunk.com, causing the website and discussion forum to become inaccessible. Longtime members and regular posters created a replacement site, ConPunk.com, in order to maintain the community, but that site went offline in May 2013, in favor of a Facebook group which too has closed as of 2014.

References

External links 
"Meet the Pro-Bush Punks" – The Guardian
"A Bush Surprise: Fright-Wing Support" – The New York Times
"For conservative punks, it's about (equal) time" – MSNBC
– "From the White House to the Punk House" – Punk Planet

American conservative websites